Letalski center Maribor short LCM (English: Aviation center Maribor) is the oldest and the biggest Slovenian general aviation aero club operating at international Maribor Airport operating with 11 aircraft and 11 gliders. Founded on December 20, 1927 in Maribor and It is well known for its flight school, ever since. It is considered to be the highest quality general aviation aero club in the country and Balkans. Annual number of flight hours is around 3500 h and 10000 landings.

Current Fleet

EASA Flight School
LCM has training programs with a European accreditation for the following licenses and ratings as well as endorsements (entries) within its SI.ATO.014 (Approved Training Organization) according to EASA - European Regulations:

Licenses

PPL(A) - Private Pilot License (aircraft)
SPL - Soaring Pilot License 

Ratings

NVFR - Night Visual Flight Rules Rating
TOW (B) - Banner Towing Rating
TOW (S) - Sailplane Towing Rating
FI (A) - Flight Instructor (Aircraft) Rating
FI (S) - Flight Instructor (Sailplane) Rating
ACRO (S) - Acrobatic flying (Sailplanes) Rating

Endorsements 

TW - Endorsement for flying with a tailwheel aircraft
VP - Endorsement for flying with Variable Pitch Propellers and Constant Speed Propellers
T  - Endorsement for flying with Turbocharged and Super Charged Engines
RU - Endorsement for flying with Retractable Undercarriage aircraft
Cloud Seeding Operations Entry
Parachute Dropping Operations Entry

EASA Maintenance Organisation

LCM has its own AMO Approved Maintenance Organisation: Aero center Maribor Ltd. AMO SI.145.15 and it is authorized for aircraft maintenance up to 5700 kg in accordance with European regulations: EASA Part 145 for base and line maintenance.

Historic Fleet

External links

 Letalski center Maribor - Official Facebook side

Flying clubs
Organizations established in 1927
Organizations based in Slovenia
Gliderports
Aviation in Slovenia
Civil aviation in Slovenia
Flight training
Aviation schools
Aircraft maintenance
Organizations based in Maribor